Herbert Solow may refer to:

Herbert Solow (journalist) (1903–1964), leftwing journalist and later editor of Fortune
Herbert F. Solow (1930–2020), television producer/writer, best-known for Star Trek